Asmenistis is a genus of moths in the family Lecithoceridae.

Species
 Asmenistis semifracta Diakonoff, 1954
 Asmenistis stephanocoma Meyrick, 1938

References

Natural History Museum Lepidoptera genus database

Lecithoceridae
Moth genera